Liza Brönner is a South African singer and songwriter. Her music is performed in both Afrikaans and English. Brönner is also a stage actress. Her debut album, Onderstebo was released on 21 September 2009 by EMI. This album has been repacked on 29 March 2010 with four new songs as Asemloos and also released by EMI. Her third album, Vir eers is dit net ek... was released on 1 September 2011 by HIT Records. In May 2013, Liza won the reality program searching for a replacement actor for the stage production (musical) Liefling. She plays the lead role across from Bobby van Jaarsveld playing Jan in the musical.

After nearly two years of performances and promotional work with her previous CD "Vir eers is dit net ek" is 2Brothers Entertainment excited to tell everyone about Liza Bronner's new CD "Jy het my gevind". "Jy het my gevind" is not only the title of her new CD, but means a lot to Liza... It's a new beginning, a new era in her career.

December 2014 - "Liefling" theatre production at the Teatro, Montecasino. The first "Afrikaans" musical playing at the Teatro. Liza is playing the role of "Liefling" again opposite Bobby van Jaarsveld.

Married to
Ricus Nel.
26 Januarie 2013

Discography
 Onderstebo, 2009
 Asemloos, 2010
 Vir eers is dit net ek, 2011
 Jy het my gevind, 2013
 New Single "Sit jou hand op jou mond", 2014

Music video list
 Jy het my gevind
 Asem jou in
 Waar jou soene hoort
 Hier by my
 Clout - Substitute (Duet with Cindy Alter)
 Alles in 'n hartklop
 Sonder jou with Louis Fivas

Philanthropy
Liza has been involved with the Hanna Charity and Empowerment Foundation where their mission is to take hands with the poor and marginalized people of South Africa. They provide personal attention and direct benefits to children, youth, ageing and their families so they may live with dignity, achieve their desired potential and participate fully in society. 
 Hanna Charity saam met Liza Bronner by Margaretha Ackerman Ouetehuis
 Hanna Charity en Liza Bronner sing Blinkvosperd by Margaretha Ackerman Ouetehuis

Media
 "Liefling Liza loop oor van vreugde" by Beeld (Lourensa Eckard) Digital on 4 June 2013
 "Hoekom jy Liefling móét gaan kyk" by Huisgenoot (Wicus Pretorius) Digital on 7 June 2013
 "Jy is my liefling" - Reality show on Kyknet
 "Album van die week: Jy het my gevind deur Liza Brönner" by Huisgenoot (Naudé van der Merwe) Digital on 14 October 2013
 "Kersfees Skouspel terug" by Carnival City (Lefra Productions) 11/29/2013
 "Liza Interview" with NET NEWS (Ken Belter)
 "Hier by my CD Launch" by Kyknet (Bravo)
 "Hier by my CD Launch" by (Jacatainment TV)
 For a complete list of released products see VETSEUN Website
"Liefling" Teatro Montecasino
 "LIEFLING" in theatre @ the Teatro Montecasino
 "Liefling die Musiekblyspel in die Teatro, Montecasino"
 "Liefling die Musiekblyspel in die Teatro, Montecasino"
 "Liefling die Musiekblyspel" by Vrouekeur
 "Liefling is ‘n treffer!" by Kyknet (Sune Lotter)
 "Liefling" by BLCK TV
 Review: Liefling by B Sharp Entertainment (Chris Avant-Smith)

See also
 List of Afrikaans singers

References

External links
 
 Hit Records’ website

1989 births
Living people
Afrikaans-language singers
21st-century South African women singers
South African songwriters